Lawrence Joseph Hanley (June 24, 1956 – May 7, 2019) was an American bus operator who eventually became International President of the Amalgamated Transit Union.

Early life 
Hanley was born on June 24, 1956, in Jamaica, Queens, NYC to James Emmet and Rose Margaret (Carey) Hanley, who were both auditors. He attended Xavier High School in Manhattan and Susan Wagner High School on Staten Island and studied at St. John's University and the College of Staten Island.

Career 
Hanley started working as a bus operator for the New York City Transit Authority in Brooklyn in 1978.

In 1984, Hanley was elected secretary-treasurer of Local 726. Three years later he was elected president, becoming the youngest person to do so.  During his tenure, Hanley spearheaded many campaigns for the Local, one of which enabled a lower Bus fare for the Express Bus service. The successful campaign led to increased ridership of the Express Bus service from Staten Island requiring additional drivers and buses.

In 2002, Hanley joined the international union's staff.  He went on to become  vice president of the International Amalgamated Transit Union.  In 2010, he became president.

From 2010 until his death in 2019, he was international president of the Amalgamated Transit Union.

Death 
Hanley died on May 7, 2019, from pulmonary heart disease.

References 

https://labornotes.org/2019/05/commuters-and-bus-drivers-unite-larry-hanleys-staten-island-campaign

1957 births
2019 deaths
People from Queens, New York
American trade union leaders
Working Families Party politicians
Trade unionists from New York (state)
Amalgamated Transit Union people